Diuris chryseopsis, commonly known as common golden moths or the small snake orchid, is a species of orchid that is endemic to south-eastern Australia. It is a common and widespread species growing in woodland, often in colonies and has up to four drooping, golden-yellow flowers. It is similar to several other orchids and form hybrids with some other Diuris species.

Description
The labellum callus is densely hairy or pimply near its base and tapers towards the tip of the labellum. Flowering occurs from August to October.

Taxonomy and naming
Diuris chryseopsis was first formally described in 1998 by David Jones from a specimen collected in a paddock near the Symmons Plains Raceway. The specific epithet (chryseopsis) is derived from the Ancient Greek words chryseos meaning "golden" and opsis meaning "sight", "look" or "appearance", referring to the colour of the flowers.

Distribution and habitat
Common golden moths grows in moist places in forest, woodland and grassland. It is found in south-eastern New South Wales, Tasmania and in Victoria where it is widespread and common. It may also occur in south-eastern South Australia. It is similar to other Diuris species and often forms hybrids with some that occur in the same area.

References

chryseopsis
Endemic orchids of Australia
Orchids of New South Wales
Orchids of the Australian Capital Territory
Orchids of Tasmania
Orchids of Victoria (Australia)
Plants described in 1998